The 2012–13 Lafayette Leopards men's basketball team represented Lafayette College during the 2012–13 NCAA Division I men's basketball season. The Leopards, led by 18th year head coach Fran O'Hanlon, played their home games at the Kirby Sports Center and were members of the Patriot League. They finished the season 19–15, 10–4 in Patriot League play to finish in a tie for second place. They advanced to the championship game of the Patriot League tournament where they lost to Bucknell. Despite their 19 wins, they did not participate in a postseason tournament.

Roster

Schedule

|-
!colspan=9| Regular season

|-
!colspan=9| 2013 Patriot League men's basketball tournament

References

Lafayette Leopards men's basketball seasons
Lafayette
Lafayette
Lafayette